Time in Ivory Coast is given by a single time zone, denoted as Greenwich Mean Time (GMT; UTC±00:00). Adopted on 1 January 1911, the Ivory Coast has never observed daylight saving time (DST).

IANA time zone database 
In the IANA time zone database, the Ivory Coast is given one zone in the file zone.tab – Africa/Abidjan. "CI" refers to the country's ISO 3166-1 alpha-2 country code. Data for Ivory Coast directly from zone.tab of the IANA time zone database; columns marked with * are the columns from zone.tab itself:

See also 
List of time zones by country
List of UTC time offsets

References

External links 
Current time in Ivory Coast at Time.is
Time in Ivory Coast at TimeAndDate.com

Time in Ivory Coast